The Giants–Packers rivalry is a National Football League (NFL) rivalry between the New York Giants and the Green Bay Packers. The two teams have played since 1970 in the National Football Conference, and they play each other in the regular season either every three years or depending on its NFC division placement, and in the postseason.

Notable games and moments
The Green Bay Packers and New York Giants have played 62 games including 24 games that have been decided by 8 points or less: Below are eight notable games from the rivalry.

 In the 1938 NFL Championship Game, the Giants and Packers met in their first playoff game. It was a battle between an 8–3 Packers Team and an 8–2–1 Giants Team. The Giants took an early 9–0 lead, but the Packers got a pair of touchdowns in the 2nd quarter to make it 16–14 at the half. The Giants played well on defense in the second half, holding the Packers to 3 points. They won their third championship in their history, 23–17, and their first playoff game against Green Bay.

 In the 1944 NFL Championship Game, the Giants and Packers met in their third playoff game. It was a battle between two teams that got 8 wins in the regular season, with the Giants being 8–1–1 and the Packers being 8–2. The Packers scored two touchdowns in the 2nd quarter and never looked back. They held a shutout through 3 quarters, and won the game 14–7. The Packers overall playoff record against the Giants is now 2–1.

 In the 1962 NFL Championship Game, the Giants and Packers played their last playoff game until 2007. The Packers were 13–1 while the Giants were 12–2. The Giants didn't score until the third quarter, but still were within 6 heading into the final quarter. However, the  Packers got a game-sealing field goal in the 4th quarter to secure a 16–7 win. The Packers improved to 4–1 against the Giants in the playoffs.

 In 1971, the Giants and Packers met for the first time in the 1970s. The Packers got a 100 yard field goal return in the first quarter to take a 7–0 lead. The Giants then went on a 28–0 run, that included two Fran Tarkenton touchdown passes, a defensive touchdown, and a special teams touchdown. The Packers got a touchdown at the end of the half to make it 28–14. It was a blowout heading into the fourth quarter as the Giants led 42–24. The Packers got a couple touchdowns and a safety to make it 42–40, but came up just short in the highest scoring game of the rivalry. For the Giants, Fran Tarkenton threw for 4 touchdown passes and had a 120.2 rating.

 In the 2007 NFC Championship game, The Packers and Giants met in their first playoff battle since 1962. The game was -1°F at kickoff, one of the coldest in NFL playoff history. The Packers were favored to win as they finished 13–3 to the Giants 10–6. Two Lawrence Tynes' field goals gave the Giants a 6–0 lead with 11:41 in the 2nd quarter. The Packers got a quick response with a Donald Driver 90 yard touchdown catch and led 10–6 at halftime. The teams got off to hot offensive starts to the second half, as the Giants won the 3rd Quarter with 14 points to the Packers’ 7, now ahead 20-17. Brandon Jacobs, Donald Lee and Ahmad Bradshaw were the players who scored touchdowns in the 3rd quarter. With 11:46 left in the 4th quarter, the Packers tied the game on a Mason Crosby 37 yard field goal. The game remained tied at 20 for the rest of regulation, so it went into overtime. The Packers won the toss, but Brett Favre threw an interception to Corey Webster, who got 9 yards on the return into Packers territory. This was Brett Favre's last pass as a Packer. Even though the Giants went three and out, they were in field goal range. Lawrence Tynes, who missed two field goals earlier, was the man who got the 47 yard field goal to win the game. This NFC Championship game sent the Giants to the Super Bowl where they pulled off a huge upset and beat the 16–0 Patriots by the score of 17–14.

 In 2011, the Packers and Giants battled it out in December as they played in an important regular season game. The Giants were 6–5 heading into the game, while the Packers were still undefeated at 11–0. Eli Manning and Aaron Rodgers both threw a touchdown pass in the 1st quarter, as the Giants led 10–7 at the end of this quarter. On the first play of the 2nd Quarter, Clay Matthews III returned an interception 38 yards for a touchdown. The Packers and Giants then traded touchdowns at the end of the half to make it 21–17 Green Bay. In the 3rd Quarter, Greg Jennings and Hakeem Nicks caught touchdowns to make it 28–24 at the end of the quarter. In the 4th quarter, the Giants trailed 35–27 inside the two minute warning, but Eli Manning led a drive that was capped off by a Hakeem Nicks touchdown catch. The Giants got the two point conversion to tie the game at 35 with 58 seconds left. However, on the final drive of the game, Aaron Rodgers completed a 24 yard pass to Jermichael Finley and a 27 yard pass to Jordy Nelson to get Green Bay well into field goal range. Mason Crosby finished it off with a game winning field goal with no time left to win it 38–35 for Green Bay.

 In the 2011 NFC Divisional round, the Giants looked for revenge from their Week 13 loss to Green Bay. The Giants were heavy underdogs, finishing the regular season at just 9–7 to the Packers’ 15–1. The game was a fast start for the Giants, as after the teams traded field goals Eli Manning found Hakeem Nicks for a 66 yard touchdown to give the Giants a 10–3 lead at the end of one quarter. John Kuhn then caught an 8 yard touchdown early in the 2nd Quarter to tie the game at 10. It was 13–10 Giants with one play left in the first half. Eli Manning completed a 37 yard Hail Mary touchdown to Hakeem Nicks to give the Giants a 20–10 lead just before the half. The Packers fell behind 30–13 but did get a touchdown from Aaron Rodgers to Donald Driver with 4:46 left in the 4th quarter. However, the hope for Green Bay was short lived, as the Giants only took 2 minutes and 10 seconds to make it a three score game. The game ended with the Giants winning 37–20, as they moved on to the NFC Championship Game. The Giants eventually won the Super Bowl against the Patriots 21–17.

 In the 2016 Wild Card round, the Packers and Giants played their most recent playoff game. The Packers finished 2016 with a 10–6 record while the Giants finished the season at 11–5. However the game was on the Packers’ home turf as they won their division, while the Giants finished behind the Dallas Cowboys in theirs. It was a slow start for Green Bay as they fell behind 6–0. The Packers got their first points with 2:20 left in the 2nd Quarter, as Aaron Rodgers completed a 5 yard touchdown to Davante Adams. This started giving Green Bay offensive momentum. Similarly to the 2011 Divisional round between these teams, there was one play left in the first half, and it was a Hail Mary. Aaron Rodgers, who completed two Hail Maries in 2015, completed another one from 42 yards away to Randall Cobb to give Green Bay a 14–6 lead before halftime. The Packers offense continued their dominance, scoring 24 points in the second half. The Giants defense, which was the 2nd best in points, never gave up 30 points in the regular season, but allowed 38 in this game. Aaron Rodgers finished with 362 yards and 4 touchdowns in the win. The Packers went on to beat the Cowboys 34–31 in the Divisional, before losing to the Falcons 44–21 in the NFC Championship.

Club success
As of 2021, the Packers and Giants have won a combined 21 championships in the league's history, including 8 Super Bowls.

 Table correct through end of the 2021 season.

Results

|-
| rowspan="2"| 
| style="| Giants  6–0
| City Stadium
| Giants  1–0
| First meeting between the two teams, and the first meeting at City Stadium.
|-
| style="| Packers   7–0
| Polo Grounds
| Tied  1–1
| First meeting at Polo Grounds.
|-
| 
| style="| Packers   20–6
| Polo Grounds
| Packers  2–1
| Packers win 1929 NFL Championship.
|-
|-

|-
| rowspan="2"| 
| style="| Packers  14–7
| City Stadium
| Packers  3–1
| 
|-
| style="| Giants  13–6
| Polo Grounds
| Packers  3–2
| Packers win 1930 NFL Championship.
|-
| rowspan="2"| 
| style="| Packers  27–7
| City Stadium
| Packers  4–2
| 
|-
| style="| Packers  14–10
| Polo Grounds
| Packers  5–2
| Packers win 1931 NFL Championship.
|-
| rowspan="2"| 
| style="| Packers  13–0
| City Stadium
| Packers  6–2
| 
|-
| style="| Giants  6–0
| Polo Grounds
| Packers  6–3
| 
|-
| rowspan="2"| 
| style="| Giants  10–7
| Borchert Field
| Packers  6–4
| First Game in Borchert Field.
|-
| style="| Giants  17–6
| Polo Grounds
| Packers  6–5
| Giants lose 1933 NFL Championship.
|-
| rowspan="2"| 
| style="| Packers  20–6
| Wisconsin State Fair Park
| Packers  7–5
| First Game in Wisconsin State Fair Park.
|-
| style="| Giants  17–3
| Polo Grounds
| Packers  7–6
| Giants win 1934 NFL Championship.
|-
| 
| style="| Packers  16–7
| City Stadium
| Packers  8–6
| Giants lose 1935 NFL Championship.
|-
| 
| style="| Packers  26–14
| Polo Grounds
| Packers  9–6
| Packers win 1936 NFL Championship.
|-
| 
| style="| Giants  10–0
| Polo Grounds
| Packers  9–7
| 
|-
| 
| style="| Giants  15–3
| Polo Grounds
| Packers  9–8
| 
|-
! 1938 playoffs
! style="| Giants  23–17
! Polo Grounds
! Tied  9–9
! First NFL Championship Game between the two teams, and also the Giants' only win in what would turn out to be five championship game meetings.
|-
! 1939 playoffs
! style="| Packers  27–0
! Wisconsin State Fair Park
! Packers  10–9
! Second NFL Championship Game between the two teams. First of four straight Packers championship wins against the Giants.
|-

|-
| 
| style="| Giants  7–3
| Polo Grounds
| Tied  10–10
| 
|-
| 
| Tie  21–21
| Polo Grounds
| Tied  10–10–1
| 
|-
| 
| style="| Packers  35–21
| Polo Grounds
| Packers  11–10–1
| 
|-
| 
| style="| Giants  24–0
| Polo Grounds
| Tied  11–11–1
| 
|-
! 1944 playoffs
! style="| Packers  14–7
! Polo Grounds
! Packers  12–11–1
! Third NFL Championship Game between the two teams.
|-
| 
| style="| Packers  23–14
| Polo Grounds
| Packers  13–11–1
| 
|-
| 
| Tie  24–24
| Polo Grounds
| Packers  13–11–2
| 
|-
| 
| style="| Giants  49–3
| Wisconsin State Fair Park
| Packers  13–12–2
| Giants largest win of the rivalry. Last meeting at Wisconsin State Fair Park.
|-
| 
| style="| Giants  30–10
| City Stadium
| Tied  13–13–2
| 
|-

|-
| 
| style="| Packers  17–3
| Polo Grounds
| Packers  14–13–2
| 
|-
| 
| style="| Giants  31–17
| City Stadium
| Tied  14–14–2
| 
|-
| 
| style="| Giants  20–3
| Yankee Stadium
| Giants  15–14–2
| First meeting at Yankee Stadium. Giants lose 1959 NFL Championship.
|-

|-
| 
| style="| Packers  20–17
| Milwaukee County Stadium
| Tied  15–15–2
| First meeting at Milwaukee County Stadium.
|-
! 1961 playoffs
! style="| Packers  37–0
! City Stadium
! Packers  16–15–2
! Fourth NFL Championship Game between the two teams. Largest Packers win over the Giants to date.
|-
! 1962 playoffs
! style="| Packers  16–7
! Yankee Stadium
! Packers  17–15–2
! Fifth and final NFL Championship Game between the two teams, resulting in the Packers being 4–1 in NFL Championship Games against the Giants. This would be the last time that the Packers and Giants met in the playoffs until the 2007–08 NFL playoffs.
|-
| 
| style="| Packers  48–21
| Yankee Stadium
| Packers  18–15–2
| Packers win 1967 NFL Championship & Super Bowl II.
|-
| 
| style="| Packers  20–10
| Milwaukee County Stadium
| Packers  19–15–2
| 
|-

|-
| 
| style="| Giants  42–40
| Lambeau Field
| Packers  19–16–2
| First meeting at Lambeau Field. Highest-scoring game in the rivalry.
|-
| 
| style="| Packers  16–14
| Yale Bowl
| Packers  20–16–2
| First Game in Yale Bowl.
|-
| 
| style="| Packers  40–14
| Milwaukee County Stadium
| Packers  21–16–2
| 
|-

|-
| 
| style="| Giants  27–21
| Giants Stadium
| Packers  21–17–2
| First meeting at Giants Stadium.
|-
| rowspan="2"| 
| style="| Packers  27–14
| Giants Stadium
| Packers  22–17–2
| 
|-
| style="| Packers  26–24
| Milwaukee County Stadium
| Packers  23–17–2
| Last meeting at Milwaukee County Stadium.
|-
| 
| style="| Packers  27–19
| Giants Stadium
| Packers  24–17–2
| 
|-
| 
| style="| Giants  27–3
| Giants Stadium
| Packers  24–18–2
| 
|-
| 
| style="| Packers  23–20
| Lambeau Field
| Packers  25–18–2
| 
|-
| 
| style="| Giants  55–24
| Giants Stadium
| Packers  25–19–2
| Most points by the Giants in the rivalry. The Giants went on to win Super Bowl XXI, their first Super Bowl win.
|-
| 
| style="| Giants  20–10
| Giants Stadium
| Packers  25–20–2
| 
|-

|-
| 
| style="| Giants  27–7
| Giants Stadium
| Packers  25–21–2
| Brett Favre's first game against the Giants.
|-
| 
| style="| Packers  14–6
| Lambeau Field
| Packers  26–21–2
| 
|-
| 
| style="| Packers  37–3
| Giants Stadium
| Packers  27–21–2
| The 34-point Packers win is the largest Packers regular-season win over the Giants.
|-

|-
| 
| style="| Packers  34–25
| Giants Stadium
| Packers  28–21–2
| Michael Strahan sets NFL record for individual sacks at 22.5.
|-
| 
| style="| Giants  14–7
| Lambeau Field
| Packers  28–22–2
| 
|-
| 
| style="| Packers  35–13
| Giants Stadium
| Packers  29–22–2
| Eli Manning's first game against the Packers. Giants win Super Bowl XLII.
|-
! 2007 playoffs
! style="| Giants  
! Lambeau Field
! Packers  29–23–2
! NFC Championship Game. First playoff battle between the two teams since the 1962 NFL Championship. Game was -1° at kickoff, and went into overtime. On his last pass as a Packer, Brett Favre threw an interception to Corey Webster, allowing Lawrence Tynes to rebound from 2 earlier missed field goals by hitting a 47-yarder to send the Giants to Super Bowl XLII.
|-

|-
| 
| style="| Packers  45–17
| Lambeau Field
| Packers  30–23–2
| Packers QB Aaron Rodgers' first game against the Giants, and his first 400-yard regular season game. The Packers' win allowed the eventual Super Bowl XLV champions to earn a tiebreaker over the Giants for the NFC's sixth seed.
|-
| 
| style="| Packers  38–35
| MetLife Stadium
| Packers  31–23–2
| First meeting at MetLife Stadium. With the game tied at 35 in the fourth quarter, Aaron Rodgers found Jermichael Finley and Jordy Nelson for big first down completions, setting up a game winning field goal by Mason Crosby.
|-
! 2011 playoffs
! style="| Giants  37–20
! Lambeau Field
! Packers  31–24–2
! NFC Divisional Round. Giants avenge their Week 13 loss to the Packers en route to their Super Bowl XLVI win. The game's most notable play came when Eli Manning found Hakeem Nicks on a Hail Mary just before halftime to make it a 20–10 game, and the Giants would end up winning 37–20.
|-
| 
| style="| Giants  38–10
| Metlife Stadium
| Packers  31–25–2
| 
|-
| 
| style="| Giants  27–13
| Metlife Stadium
| Packers  31–26–2
| Originally scheduled for Sunday Night Football, but got flexed out when Aaron Rodgers sustained a broken collarbone two weeks earlier and would miss the game as a result. Backup Scott Tolzien would throw three interceptions in the 27-13 Giants victory. 
|-
| 
| style="| Packers  23–16
| Lambeau Field
| Packers  32–26–2
| 
|-
! 2016 playoffs
! style="| Packers  38–13
! Lambeau Field
! Packers  33–26–2
! NFC Wild Card Round. Packers avenge their previous home playoff losses to Eli Manning. The most memorable play of this game came right before halftime, as Aaron Rodgers found Randall Cobb for a 42 yard Hail Mary touchdown at the end of the first half, similar to the Hakeem Nicks Hail Mary against the Packers in the 2011 playoffs.
|-
| 
| style="| Packers  31–13
| Metlife Stadium
| Packers  34–26–2
| Eli Manning's final NFL season.
|-

|-
|
| style="| Giants  27–22
| Tottenham Hotspur Stadium
| Packers  34–27–2
| Game played as part of the NFL International Series, officially a Packers home game
|-

|-
| Regular season
| style="|
| 
| 
| Packers 4–0 in games played at Milwaukee County Stadium, Giants 1–0 in London (officially a Packers home game)
|-
| Postseason
| style="|
| 
| 
| NFC Wild Card: 2016. NFC Divisional: 2011. NFC Championship: 2007. NFL Championship: 1938, 1939, 1944, 1961, 1962.
|-
| Regular and postseason 
| style="|
| 
| 
| 
|-

See also

National Football League rivalries

References

External links

New York Giants
National Football League rivalries
Green Bay Packers rivalries
New York Giants rivalries